Asekeyevo is the name of several rural localities in Asekeyevsky District of Orenburg Oblast, Russia:
Asekeyevo (selo), a selo in Asekeyevsky Selsoviet
Asekeyevo (station), a station in Asekeyevsky Selsoviet